"Never Let Me Down" is a song recorded by English singer David Bowie, serving as the title track for his 1987 studio album of the same name. It was released as the third and final single from the record in 1987, and served as his last solo single until 1992's "Real Cool World" (although a remix of "Fame" was released in 1990). "Never Let Me Down" was written by the singer himself and Carlos Alomar, while production was handled by Bowie along with David Richards.

Music critics viewed the track as one of the best on Never Let Me Down and listed it among the most underrated of his career. An accompanying music video for the single was shot by French director Jean-Baptiste Mondino and similarly received positive response. Commercially, "Never Let Me Down" reached number 27 on the Billboard Hot 100 and number 34 on the UK Singles Chart. It was aided by a CD release, Bowie's first, and remained the singer's last single to chart within the top 40 in the United States until "Lazarus" (2015).

Background and development 
"Never Let Me Down" was the last track written and recorded for the album, but despite this, Bowie said that the song was "completely finished in twenty-four hours from the beginning of the writing to the end of the arranging". The name of the track was originally "Isolation" before Bowie changed it. He had started with his own chord structure for the song but wasn't happy with it, calling it "ponderous and funereal." Long-time collaborator and co-songwriter Carlos Alomar reworked the chords for "Never Let Me Down", using a chord structure from a song he had written on his own called "I'm Tired", and thus received part of the writing credit for the track. The singer described the single as a "pivotal" track for himself, calling it the most personal song he had written for an album to that point in his career. The recording is about Bowie's long-time personal assistant, Coco Schwab. Bowie described their relationship, saying:

Release and promotion 
"Never Let Me Down" was released through EMI in 1987 and was the first Bowie single to be made available on CD, including a newly remixed version. A digital download version of the tracks was made available online in 2007. Bowie performed the song on BBC's Top of the Pops on 16 September 1987 and it was aired on the first broadcast of the American version of the show. The track was additionally performed live during his 1987 Glass Spider Tour and included as part of the Glass Spider (1988) concert film. The song was added to several compilation albums, including Bowie: The Singles 1969–1993 (1993) and Best of Bowie (2002). A re-mastered / re-recorded version of the song, as well as several original remixes of the song, appear on the box set Loving the Alien (1983–1988) (2018).

Music video 

French director Jean-Baptiste Mondino was selected by Bowie to direct an accompanying music video. Regarding this, Bowie said, "It's an experiment; I'm really putting myself in his [Jean-Baptiste's] hands. [...] I think if I did it [the video myself], it would be very abrasive, and I'm not quite sure if that's how I want the song to come off visually. In concert it will be abrasive; it won't have the same quality as the video. But I really think Mondino is a fantastic video maker. He just knows that this is his genre. He's like a craftsman and that's what he's trying to perfect, this craft of making his five minutes work." Actor Joe Dallesandro makes appearances throughout the clip, announcing the dance marathon. A shot from the music video was used to commercialize 7" releases of the single.

The video, described as a dream-like portrayal of a 1950s-style dance marathon, was viewed positively by one critic, who called it "creative and engaging." A review in the Los Angeles Times scores the video "excellent (85/100)" and the newspaper later rated the clip as one of the Top 10 of 1987. Bowie encyclopedist Nicholas Pegg called the video "years ahead of its time", saying that it "beautifully captures the song's dreamlike quality."

Reception 
Stephen Thomas Erlewine of AllMusic described the song as a "John Lennon homage" and one of Bowie's "most underrated songs". Pegg called the track "among the strongest" from the album due to its "refreshing spontaneity", compared to the overproduction of the rest of the album. Commercially, "Never Let Me Down" was Bowie's last single to chart inside the top 40 of Billboard Hot 100 until his "Lazarus" (2015) did so in 2016. Additionally, the track peaked at number 34 on the UK Singles Chart.

Track listing 
"Never Let Me Down" was written by Bowie and Alomar, and "'87 and Cry" solely by Bowie. A limited edition picture disk (EAP 239) was issued in some territories. All songs were made available as digital downloads in 2007.

 UK 7" single
 "Never Let Me Down (Single Version)" – 3:58
 "'87 and Cry (Single Version)" – 3:53
 US 12" Single #1
 "Never Let Me Down (Extended Dance Mix)" – 7:00
 "'87 and Cry (Edit)" – 3:53
 "Never Let Me Down (Dub)" – 3:55
 "Never Let Me Down (A Cappella)" – 2:03
 US 12" single #2
 "Never Let Me Down (Extended dance mix)" – 7:00
 "Never Let Me Down (7" remix edit)" – 3:58
 "Never Let Me Down (Dub)" – 3:55
 "Never Let Me Down (A Capella)" – 2:03
 "Never Let Me Down (Instrumental)" – 4:00
 "'87 and Cry (Edit)" – 3:53

 Japan CD single
 "Never Let Me Down (Extended dance mix)" – 7:01
 "Never Let Me Down (7" remix)" – 3:58
 "Never Let Me Down (Dub)" – 3:55
 "Never Let Me Down (A Cappella)" – 2:03
 "Never Let Me Down (Instrumental)" – 4:00
 "'87 and Cry (Single version)" – 3:53

Credits and personnel 
Credits adapted from the liner notes of Never Let Me Down.
 Carlos Alomar – composer, guitar
 "Crusher" Bennett – percussion
 Spencer Bernard – synthesizers
 David Bowie – composer, producer, vocals
 David Eiland – alto saxophone
 Steve Hodge – keyboards
 Erdal Kizilcay – bass, drums, keyboards
 David Richards – producer

Charts

Notes

Bibliography 
 Pegg, Nicholas, The Complete David Bowie New Edition: Expanded and Updated, Titan Books, 2016,

References 

1987 singles
David Bowie songs
Songs written by David Bowie
Songs written by Carlos Alomar
Music videos directed by Jean-Baptiste Mondino